Strzelin  is a town in Lower Silesian Voivodeship in south-western Poland. It is part of the Wrocław metropolitan area.

The town is the seat of Strzelin County and also of the smaller municipality (gmina) of Strzelin. It is known for its extensive granite quarries, and contains Europe's deepest granite quarry. It is 123 meters deep and covers 19.5 ha

History

The settlement dates back to the beginnings of the Polish state. In the 12th century the Romanesque St. Godehard's Rotunda was built. The town was mentioned in the 13th and 14th centuries by its Old Polish name of Strelin. The name of the town derives from the Polish word strzała, meaning "arrow". The town's coat of arms is an example of canting, as it depicts an arrow, alluding to the town's name. It was granted town rights in 1292 by Duke Bolko I the Strict of the Piast dynasty, who also built defensive walls.

As a result of the fragmentation of Poland into smaller duchies, it became part of the Duchy of Legnica, remaining under rule of the Piasts until 1675. In the 15th century, the Hussites captured and plundered Strzelin three times. After that, in the 15th and 16th centuries the town flourished. The town's wealth came from clothmaking, shoemaking, tanning, brewing, metalworking. Strzelin was plundered many times by troops from various countries during the Thirty Years' War. In the 17th century Strzelin was located in a still predominantly Polish-speaking area. Strzelin was inhabited mainly by Poles and, as a result of immigration, by Germans and Jews.

After the death of the last Piast duke George William in 1675, the town was incorporated into the Habsburg-ruled Bohemian (Czech) Kingdom and the period of religious tolerance ended. The town's self-government was limited and the tax pressure increased. In 1742 the town was annexed by the Kingdom of Prussia. Afterwards the last remains of the town's autonomy were liquidated and a Germanisation action took place. During the Napoleonic Wars, in 1807 Polish-Italian troops marched through the town, and in 1815 also Russian troops. In the 19th century new factories were established: a brick factory in 1868, a sugar factory in 1871. In 1871, a railway line connecting Strzelin with regional capital Wrocław was opened. Soon the town gained railway connections with other cities in Lower Silesia.

During World War II, the Germans brought thousands of prisoners of war to the town and the surrounding area: Poles, Frenchmen, Belgians, Russians, Englishmen and Yugoslavs. Near the end of the war, in January 1945, the German authorities displaced all the town's population. The German mayor of the town ordered to blow up the town hall tower and the tower of the Holy Cross church. On one of the town's squares, Germans hanged six Polish workers, who were hiding in the abandoned town. It was severely damaged in the course of the Lower Silesian Offensive of the Red Army against the Wehrmacht in February 1945. In May 1945 Strzelin was handed over to the Polish administration.

As of 2019, the town has a population of 12,460.

Notable people
 Paul Ehrlich (1854–1915), physician
 Johann von Ravenstein (1889–1962), Wehrmacht general
 Utz Richter (1928–2015), actor and voice actor
 Błażej Augustyn, footballer, born 1988
 Michał Masłowski, footballer, born 1989
 Kacper "Uszaty" Kwiatkowski, actor, born 2012

Twin towns – sister cities
See twin towns of Gmina Strzelin.

References

External links
 Official town homepage 
 TelewizjaStrzelin, a local TV station
 strzelin.net, a local news site
 Jewish Community in Strzelin on Virtual Shtetl
 PTTK Strzelin
 local newspaper "Strzeliński Ekspress Ogłoszeniowy" which alone has in his title coat of arms ,official

Cities and towns in Lower Silesian Voivodeship
Strzelin County